The 2010 season was Gangwon FC's second season in the K-League in South Korea. Gangwon FC will be competing in K-League, League Cup and Korean FA Cup.

Current squad

Out on loan

K-League

Korean FA Cup

League Cup

Group A

Squad statistics

Appearances and goals
Statistics accurate as of match played 7 November 2010

Top scorers

NB: In 2010 season, Seo Dong-Hyun has two league goals in Suwon, his previous club and Lee Sang-don has one league cup goal in Suwon

Discipline

Transfer

In

Out

References

 Gangwon FC website 

South Korean football clubs 2010 season
2010